Živan Ljukovčan (born 24 July 1954) is a former Yugoslav and Serbian footballer who played as a goalkeeper.

Club career
Born in Krčedin, Ljukovčan started out with Novi Sad in the Yugoslav Second League, before transferring to Yugoslav First League club Red Star Belgrade in 1977. He later also played for Timok, Pelister, and Budućnost Titograd. In 1986, Ljukovčan went abroad to Turkey and spent two years with Fenerbahçe. He subsequently returned to Yugoslavia and played two seasons for OFK Beograd, before retiring from the game.

International career
Ljukovčan was capped four times for Yugoslavia between 1985 and 1986.

Honours
Red Star Belgrade
 Yugoslav First League: 1979–80, 1980–81
 Yugoslav Cup: 1984–85

References

External links
 
 

Association football goalkeepers
Expatriate footballers in Turkey
Fenerbahçe S.K. footballers
FK Budućnost Podgorica players
FK Pelister players
FK Timok players
OFK Beograd players
Red Star Belgrade footballers
Red Star Belgrade non-playing staff
RFK Novi Sad 1921 players
Serbian footballers
Süper Lig players
Yugoslav expatriate footballers
Yugoslav expatriate sportspeople in Turkey
Yugoslav First League players
Yugoslav footballers
Yugoslavia international footballers
1954 births
Living people